This is a list of British television related events from 1955.

Events

January
January – First televised Welsh language play, Cap Wil Tomos.
2 January – Annette Mills, host of Muffin the Mule, makes her last appearance on television.
10 January – Annette Mills dies from a heart attack after an operation. Following her death, Muffin the Mule is dropped by the BBC Television Service.
15 January 
The Benny Hill Show premieres on the BBC Television Service, later moving to ITV. Its global audience figures will be counted in the billions.
The BBC broadcasts Heinz Sielmann's pioneering nature documentary Zimmerleute des Waldes as Woodpecker at the behest of David Attenborough and presented by Peter Scott; it is repeated several times during the year.
16 January – Sooty gets his own TV series hosted by Harry Corbett.

February
No events.

March
No events.

April
8 April –  The BBC broadcasts Billy Graham's All Scotland Crusade live from the Kelvin Hall in Glasgow. This has the second highest audience share at this time, after the Coronation.

May
May – A consortium of the initial four Independent Television broadcasting companies establishes ITN, which will provide ITV with its news service when it launches in September.
17 May – Sir Anthony Eden hosts a ground-breaking television election programme for the Conservative Party, the first broadcast of its type. The 30 minute programme features government ministers pitted against newspaper editors.
26–27 May – The BBC provides around 17 hours of results coverage of the 1955 United Kingdom general election. The BBC records the coverage for the first time but only around three hours still exists in the BBC archives.

June
29 June – Life with the Lyons, one of the first successful British sitcoms (starring British-domiciled American couple Ben Lyon and Bebe Daniels), premieres on the BBC Television Service, having previously been broadcast only on radio. It will later transfer to ITV.

July
9 July – Dixon of Dock Green premieres on the BBC Television Service.
21 July – The BBC brings into service its Divis transmitting station, its first permanent 405-line VHF Band I facility serving Northern Ireland, marking the launch of a television service for Northern Ireland; the 35 kW transmissions can also be readily received in much of the Republic of Ireland.
29 July – This Is Your Life premieres on the BBC Television Service.

August
No events.

September
4 September – Newsreaders appear "in vision" for the first time.
14 September – The highly popular and long-running children's show Crackerjack is broadcast for the very first time on BBC TV and hosted by Eamonn Andrews.
22 September – Commercial television starts in the UK, with the launch of ITV in London, Associated-Rediffusion on weekdays and Associated Television Network (ATV) at weekends. The rest of the UK receive their ITV regions over the next seven years. Leslie Mitchell is the first announcer to be heard, the first advertisement shown is for Gibbs SR toothpaste.
25 September – ATV's variety show Sunday Night at the London Palladium launches on ITV; tonight's edition is compered by Tommy Trinder with Gracie Fields and Guy Mitchell featuring; the programme initially runs until 1967. This evening also, ITV launches I Love Lucy on UK television.
September – Barbara Mandell becomes Britain's first female newsreader, presenting the Midday News bulletin on ITV.

October
10 October – Alexandra Palace begins test transmissions of a 405-line colour television service.
22 October – Quatermass II sequel to 1953's The Quatermass Experiment, premieres on the BBC Television Service. It ends on 26 November.

November
No events.

December
25 December – After being on radio since 1932, the Royal Christmas Message is broadcast on British television for the first time, in sound only at 3pm. The first visual Christmas message is shown in 1957.

Undated
Fanny Cradock records the pilot for a long-running cookery series with the BBC.

New channels

Debuts

BBC Television Service/BBC TV
8 January – Return to the Lost Planet (1955)
15 January – The Benny Hill Show (1955–1961; 1964; 1966–1968; 1969–1989)
16 January – The Sooty Show (1955–1967; 1968–1992)
16 February – Portrait of Alison (1955)
16 February – Look at It This Way (1955)
22 February – Benbow and the Angels (1955)
5 April – The Children of the New Forest (1955)
16 April – The Mulberry Accelerator (1955)
17 May – Thunder Rock (1955)
21 May – The Ted Ray Show (1955–1959)
28 May – Terminus (1955)
3 June – Bath-Night with Braden (1955)
29 June – Life with the Lyons (1955–1960)
3 July – Holiday Hotel (1955)
5 July – The Gordon Honour (1955–1956)
9 July – Dixon of Dock Green (1955–1976)
15 July – Appointment with Drama (1955)
29 July – This Is Your Life (1955–1964, 1969–2003, 2007)
21 August – The Prince and the Pauper (1955)
10 September – As I Was Saying (1955)
14 September – Crackerjack (1955–1984, 2020–present)
2 October – The Blakes (1955)
4 October – Great Scott - It's Maynard! (1955–1956)
15 October – The Dave King Show (1955–1957)
22 October – Quatermass II (1955)
30 October – St. Ives (1955)
10 December – The Adventures of Annabel (1955–1956)
16 December – Here and Now (1955)
22 December – Vera Lynn Sings (1955–1959)
Unknown
Kitchen Magic (1955)
Sunday Night Theatre (1955–1959)
The Brains Trust (1955–1961)
Look (natural history series presented by Peter Scott, 1955–1981)
Picture Book (1955–1965)
The Woodentops (1955–1958)
The Gardening Club (1955–1967)
It's Magic (1955–1958)

ITV
23 September – Sixpenny Corner (1955–1956)
23 September – Take Your Pick! (1955–1968, 1992–1999)
24 September 
My Hero (1955–1956)
Colonel March of Scotland Yard  (1955–1956)
25 September 
I Love Lucy (1951–1957) (later The Lucy-Desi Show 1957–1960; The Lucy Show 1962–1967; Here's Lucy 1968–1974)
The Adventures of Noddy (1955–1956)
The Adventures of Robin Hood (1955–1959)
Sunday Night at the London Palladium (1955–1967, 1973–1974)
26 September – Double Your Money (1955–1968)
27 September – ITV Play of the Week (1955–1974)
28 September – The Adventures of the Scarlet Pimpernel  (1955–1956)
2 October – Joan and Leslie  (1955–1958)
9 October – Theatre Royal (1955–1956)
10 October – The Granville Melodramas (1955–1956)
4 November – Love and Kisses (1955)
Unknown 
Mick and Montmorency (1955–1958)
Douglas Fairbanks Presents (1955–1959)
Sailor of Fortune (1955–1956)
The Adventures of Rin Tin Tin (1954–1959)
Lassie (1954–1974)
The Roy Rogers Show (1951–1957)

Continuing television shows

1920s
BBC Wimbledon (1927–1939, 1946–2019, 2021–2024)

1930s
The Boat Race (1938–1939, 1946–2019)
BBC Cricket (1939, 1946–1999, 2020–2024)

1940s
Television Dancing Club (1948–1962; 1963–1964)
Come Dancing (1949–1998)

1950s
Andy Pandy (1950–1970, 2002–2005)
What's My Line? (1951–1963; 1973–1974; 1984–1990)
Flower Pot Men (1952–1958, 2001–2002)
Watch with Mother (1952–1975)
The Appleyards (1952–1957)
All Your Own (1952–1961)
Billy Bunter of Greyfriars School (1952–1961)
Animal, Vegetable, Mineral? (1952–1959)
Before Your Very Eyes (1953–1956; 1956–1958)
Asian Club (1953–1961)
Rag, Tag and Bobtail (1953–1965)
The Good Old Days (1953–1983)
Panorama (1953–present)
Fabian of the Yard (1954–1956)
The Grove Family (1954–1957)
Zoo Quest (1954–1963)
Sportsview (1954–1968)
Emney Enterprise (1954–1957)
Carols from King's (1954–present)

Ending this year
Muffin the Mule (1946–1955, 2005–2006)
Garrison Theatre (1953–1955)
Face the Music (1953–1955)
Walk in the Air (1954–1955)
Stage by Stage (1954–1955)
Fast and Loose (1954–1955)
Show Case (1954–1955)

Births
 5 January – Jimmy Mulville, comedian and producer
 6 January
 Rowan Atkinson, comedian and actor
 Arthur Bostrom, actor
 17 January – Gaby Rado, television journalist (died 2003)
 3 February – Kirsty Wark, television presenter
 8 February – Carol Harrison, actress and writer
 18 March – Jeff Stelling, sports journalist and television presenter 
 29 March – Marina Sirtis, actress
 5 April – Janice Long, née Chegwin, pop music presenter (died 2021)
 22 May – Dale Winton, broadcast presenter (died 2018)
 7 June – Dean Sullivan, actor
 14 June 
 Gillian Bailey, actor
 Paul O'Grady, talk show host and comedian 
 23 June – Maggie Philbin, broadcast presenter
 14 August – Gillian Taylforth, actress
 20 September – David Haig, actor
 18 October – Timmy Mallett, television presenter
 9 November – Karen Dotrice, actress
 22 November – George Alagiah, BBC journalist and newsreader

See also
 1955 in British music
 1955 in the United Kingdom
 List of British films of 1955

References